Longwood University, a public liberal arts college in Farmville, Virginia, is led by a president selected by a Board of Visitors, who are appointed by the Governor of Virginia. Beginning with its founding as a private finishing school in 1839, through its 1884 conversion to a public normal school, and its postwar transition to a coeducational university, Longwood has had twenty-seven presidents. The current president is W. Taylor Reveley IV, who was inaugurated in 2013.

Principals (1839–1884)
In the private finishing school era, when the school was known as Farmville Female Seminary and later Farmville Female College, the school president was known as a principal.

Presidents (1884–present)
Following the Virginia government's purchase of the then-Farmville College in 1884 and conversion into a normal school, the head official of Longwood became known as a president.

References

Longwood University
Longwood University presidents